Joja Wendt (born 31 July 1964 as Johan Wendt) is a German jazz pianist and composer.

Education and early career
Wendt was born in Hamburg. The son of a female singer and a doctor, he began playing the piano at the age of four. He decided soon after leaving school at the Lise-Meitner-Gymnasium in Osdorf, Hamburg to turn to jazz. He then played regularly in the Hamburg music pub Sperl, where he was discovered by Joe Cocker. Cocker took Wendt as the opening act of his tour of Germany, so he became known quickly throughout the country.

Important stations were concerts with Chuck Berry, whose Germany tour he accompanied on the piano, or with the band Pur in the sold-out Arena Auf Schalke, and the soundtrack to 7 Zwerge – Männer allein im Wald. After working in the Dutch town of Hilversum and studying in New York City, he returned to Hamburg, where he now lives with his wife and two children in Groß Flottbek. In addition to his passion for jazz, blues and boogie-woogie, he also cares about early musical education of children.

Awards
Wendt was awarded a Louis Armstrong student award and has been included in the circle of Steinway artists by Steinway & Sons.

Discography
 The Art Of Boogie-Woogie (1991)
 Cookin' (1992)
 Live (1993)
 Fifty-Fifty (1994) (feat. Inga Rumpf)
 Good Morning Blues (1995) (feat. Abi Wallenstein)
 The Art Of Early Jazz Piano (1996)
 In The 25th Hour (1996) (feat. Inga Rumpf)
 Blues On Air (1997) (feat. Abi Wallenstein)
 Live At Lloyds (1997) (feat. Inga Rumpf)
 Pacifique (1997) (feat. Les McCann)
 hummelflug.de (1998)
 L'Eglise (1999)
 Der Pianist (2000)
 Showtime (2002)
 Live! ... sehr schwer zu spielen (2003)
 The Grand Piano (2005)
 Mit 88 Tasten um die Welt (2007)
 Im Zeichen der Lyra (2011)
 Joja´s Klaviermusik (2016)

Filmography
 2004: 7 Zwerge - Männer allein im Wald
 2005: Zibb
 2006: Hermann & Tietjen
 2006: 7 Zwerge - Der Wald ist nicht genug
 2007: Volle Kanne
 2007 - 2008: DAS!
 2008: Happy Otto - Wir haben Grund zum Feiern ...
 2008: Dein Song
 2008: Wetten, dass..?
 2008: Joja Wendt - Mit 88 Tasten um die Welt: Live
 2008: Ein Abend für ... 
 2009: NDR Talk Show
 2013: Heinz Erhardt ist Kult! Der große Humorist und sein Erbe
 2013: Krömer - Late Night Show 
 2013: Deutschlands Superhirn

References

Living people
1964 births
German jazz musicians
German composers